Vannucci is a surname. Notable people with the surname include:

 (1810–1883), Italian historian, patriot and politician
Chiara Vannucci (born 1993)  Italian racing cyclist
Damiano Vannucci (born 1977), Sanmarinese footballer
Marina Vannucci, Italian statistician
Olivier Vannucci (born 1991), French footballer
Pietro Vannucci, known as Pietro Perugino, 15th-16th-century Italian Renaissance painter, master of Raphael
Ronnie Vannucci Jr. (born 1976), American rock drummer for the Killers
Valdo Vannucci (born 1947), Italian politician and professor